Webb Beach is a locality in the Australian state of South Australia located on the eastern coastline of Gulf St Vincent about  north-northwest of the state capital of Adelaide. The 2016 Australian census which was conducted in August 2016 reports that it had a population of 47 people.  Webb Beach is located within the federal Division of Grey, the state electoral district of Narungga, and the local government area of the Adelaide Plains Council.

See also
List of cities and towns in South Australia

References

Towns in South Australia
Gulf St Vincent